Deepika (ദീപിക, दीपिका) is a Hindu/Sanskrit Indian feminine given name, which means "lantern" and "light".

Notable people named Deepika 
 Deepika Chikhalia (born 1965), Indian actress and politician
 Deepika Joshi-Shah (1976-2012), Indian actress and singer
 Deepika Kamaiah (born 1984), Indian actress and model
 Deepika Kumari (born 1994), Indian archer
 Deepika Kurup (born 1998), Indian inventor, scientist and clean water advocate
 Deepika Padukone (born 1986), Indian actress and model
 Deepika Rasangika (born 1983), Sri Lankan cricketer
 Deepika Singh (born 1986), Indian actress

Notable people named Dipika 
 Dipika Murthy (born 1980), Indian hockey player
 Dipika O'Neill Joti (born 1967), Turkish-Australian actress and model
 Dipika Pallikal (born 1991), Indian squash player
 Dipika Kakar (born 1989), Indian TV actress

Notable people named Deeyah 
 Deeyah Khan (born 1977), Norwegian film director, music producer, composer, and human rights defender

Fictional characters 
 Deepika, from the Mohammad Hossain Jemy's 2011 film Bajaw Biyer Bajna

See also 
 Deepali (disambiguation)

Hindu given names
Indian feminine given names